The Sudarshan-Glauber P representation is a suggested way of writing down the phase space distribution of a quantum system in the phase space formulation of quantum mechanics.  The P representation is the quasiprobability distribution in which observables are expressed in normal order.  In quantum optics, this representation, formally equivalent to several other representations, is sometimes preferred over such alternative representations to describe light in optical phase space, because typical optical observables, such as the particle number operator, are naturally expressed in normal order.  It is named after George Sudarshan and Roy J. Glauber, who  worked   on the topic in 1963.
Despite many useful applications in laser theory and coherence theory, the Glauber–Sudarshan P representation has the peculiarity  that it is not always positive, and is not a  bona-fide probability function.

Definition

We wish to construct a function  with the property that the density matrix  is diagonal in the basis of coherent states , i.e.,

We also wish to construct the function such that the expectation value of a normally ordered operator satisfies the optical equivalence theorem.  This implies that the density matrix should be in anti-normal order so that we can express the density matrix as a power series

Inserting the identity operator

we see that

and thus we formally assign

One method is to define the characteristic function

and then take the Fourier transform

Note that both of these integral formulas do not converge in any usual sense for "typical" systems . The following formula shows that it is always possible to write the density matrix in this diagonal form without appealing to operator orderings using the inversion (given here for a single mode),

Though this is a full formal solution of this possibility, it requires infinitely many derivatives of Dirac delta functions, far beyond the reach of any ordinary tempered distribution theory.

Discussion
If the quantum system has a classical analog, e.g. a coherent state or thermal radiation, then  is non-negative everywhere like an ordinary probability distribution. If, however, the quantum system has no classical analog, e.g. an incoherent Fock state or entangled system, then  is negative somewhere or more singular than a Dirac delta function. (By a theorem of Schwartz, distributions that are more singular than the Dirac delta function are always negative somewhere.) Even if  does behave like an ordinary probability distribution, however, the matter is not quite so simple. According to Mandel and Wolf: "The different coherent states are not [mutually] orthogonal, so that even if  behaved like a true probability density [function], it would not describe probabilities of mutually exclusive states."

Examples

Thermal radiation
From statistical mechanics arguments in the Fock basis, the mean photon number of a mode with wavevector  and polarization state  for a black body at temperature  is known to be

The  representation of the black body is

In other words, every mode of the black body is normally distributed in the basis of coherent states.  Since  is positive and bounded, this system is essentially classical.  This is actually quite a remarkable result because for thermal equilibrium the density matrix is also diagonal in the Fock basis, but Fock states are non-classical.

Highly singular example
Even very simple-looking states may exhibit highly non-classical behavior.  Consider a superposition of two coherent states

where  are constants subject to the normalizing constraint

As it is straightforward to calculate , we can use the Mehta formula above to compute ,

Despite having infinitely many derivatives of delta functions,  still obeys the optical equivalence theorem.

See also
Quasiprobability distribution#Characteristic functions
Nonclassical light
Wigner quasiprobability distribution
Husimi Q representation
Nobel Prize controversies

References

Citations

Bibliography

Quantum optics